Theodoridis is a Greek surname. It is a patronymic surname which literally means "the son of Theodoros (Theodore)". 
Notable people with surname Theodoridis:

Anastasis Theodoridis, Greek journalist
Chrysanthos Theodoridis (1933–2005), Pontic Greek singer
Georgios Theodoridis (born 1972), Greek sprinter
Giorgos Theodoridis (born 1980), Greek footballer
Ioannis Theodoridis, Lufthansa Systems FMS Customer Support specialist
Natassa Theodoridou (born 1970), Greek singer
Savvas Theodoridis (1935–2020), Greek footballer
Sergios Theodoridis, Greek scientist
Stefanos Theodoridis (born 1950), Greek footballer
Thallis Theodoridis (disambiguation), multiple people
Theodoros Theodoridis, Greek fashion model
Vasileios Theodoridis, Greek journalist
Yannis Theodoridis, Greek scientist

Greek-language surnames
Surnames
Patronymic surnames
Surnames from given names